Thomas Calvert McClary (February 13, 1909 – 1972) was an American writer of science fiction and westerns.  He wrote under the pseudonyms T.C. McClary, Thomas Calvert, and Calvin Peregoy. 
His books include:

 Rebirth: When Everyone Forgot! (1944) (originally serialized in 1934 in Astounding Science Fiction)
 Three Thousand Years (1938 ASF; 1954)
 The Tommyknocker (1940 In Unknown magazine)

External links

Westerns by McClary listed in the FictionMags Index

References

20th-century American novelists
American male novelists
American science fiction writers
1909 births
1972 deaths
American male short story writers
20th-century American short story writers
20th-century American male writers